Sead Brunčević (born 15 May 1977) is a Serbian retired footballer.

Club career
Born in Novi Pazar, Brunčević began his career playing for FK Novi Pazar in Serbian second division. In the 2001/02 season he moved to FK Remont Čačak and played in Serbian First League. 2002 he moved to Croatia and played in NK Zagreb in Prva HNL. After one season, he moved back to Serbia and played in First League of Serbia and Montenegro with FK Borac Čačak.  In 2004 Sead moved to Romania and played in CFR Cluj in Liga I. In the summer of 2005, Brunčević helped CFR Cluj reach the 2005 UEFA Intertoto Cup final by playing 5 matches in the campaign. After two years in CFR Cluj he moved to Gloria Bistrița. At Gloria Bistrița he played one and a half years and after that he moved back to FK Novi Pazar play one and half year after which he finished his career. Immediately after retiring he was appointed as the new director of football of FK Novi Pazar.

Honours
CFR Cluj
UEFA Intertoto Cup runner-up: 2005

References

External links
 Profile at Srbijafudbal
 

1977 births
Living people
Sportspeople from Novi Pazar
Serbian footballers
Association football midfielders
FK Novi Pazar players
FK Borac Čačak players
NK Zagreb players
Croatian Football League players
Expatriate footballers in Croatia
CFR Cluj players
ACF Gloria Bistrița players
Liga I players
Expatriate footballers in Romania
Serbian SuperLiga players
Serbian football managers
FK Novi Pazar managers